The 1904 United States presidential election in Louisiana took place on November 8, 1904. All contemporary 45 states were part of the 1904 United States presidential election. State voters chose nine electors to the Electoral College, which selected the president and vice president.

Louisiana was won by the Democratic nominees, Chief Judge Alton B. Parker of New York and his running mate Henry G. Davis of West Virginia.

Results

See also
 United States presidential elections in Louisiana

References

Louisiana
1904
1904 Louisiana elections